The Acidithiobacillales are an order of bacteria within the class Acidithiobacillia and comprises the genera Acidithiobacillus and Thermithiobacillus. Originally, both were included in the genus Thiobacillus, but they are not related to the type species, which belongs to the Betaproteobacteria.

References

External links
Acidithiobacillales LPSN List of Prokaryotic names with Standing in Nomenclature

 
Acidithiobacillia
Acidophiles